Nawab Zada Wali Muhammad Khan  (born 4 May 1965) is a Pakistani politician, and parliamentarian. He was elected a member of Provincial assembly on a ticket of Pakistan Muslim League N from PK-59 (Battagram) in 2013 Pakistani general election.

References

Living people
Swati
1965 births